Tony Glavin (born 29 April 1958) is a Scottish former professional footballer who played as a midfielder in both Scotland and the United States, making over 300 career appearances. His elder brother Ronnie was also a footballer.

Playing career
Born in Glasgow, Glavin spent time in the Scottish Football League with both Queen's Park and Hamilton Academical, before playing in the United States (in both the North American Soccer League and the Major Indoor Soccer League) for the Philadelphia Fury, the St. Louis Steamers, and the Kansas City Comets.

Coaching career
On 9 February 1987, the St. Louis Steamers fired head coach Pat McBride and replaced him with Glavin. Glavin then worked as an Assistant for the Kansas City Comets, playing a handful of games for them. In August 1990, he was hired to coach the Dayton Dynamo of the American Indoor Soccer Association. In 1994, he founded the "Tony Glavin Soccer Club" in Cottleville, Missouri. In December 2005, the United Soccer Leagues awarded a franchise to Glavin and his partners, which became the St. Louis Lions, to which Glavin was also named as Head Coach of the team, known as the St. Louis Lions. In December 2015 he was announced as the new head coach of the St. Louis Ambush. On July 18, 2017, Tony Glavin was removed from the head coaching position of the Ambush, though he remains a part-owner of the team.

References

1958 births
Living people
American Indoor Soccer Association coaches
Kansas City Comets (original MISL) players
Major Indoor Soccer League (1978–1992) coaches
Major Indoor Soccer League (1978–1992) players
North American Soccer League (1968–1984) players
Philadelphia Fury (1978–1980) players
Queen's Park F.C. players
Scottish footballers
Scottish Football League players
Scottish expatriate footballers
St. Louis Steamers (original MISL) players
Hamilton Academical F.C. players
Footballers from Glasgow
Association football midfielders
Scottish expatriate sportspeople in the United States
Expatriate soccer players in the United States
St. Louis Ambush (2013–) coaches
Major Arena Soccer League coaches
USL League Two coaches
Scottish football managers